The Dome Center is a fair and convention complex located in Henrietta, New York, just outside the city of Rochester.  It was originally part of a 60 acre site that hosted the annual  Monroe County (NY) Fair between 1947 and 2013.

Facilities

Dome Arena
It was built in 1972 with what was at the time one of the largest self-supporting wooden roofs in the world, and was the home of the Rochester Zeniths of the Continental Basketball Association from 1978 to 1983. It is the site of concerts, trade shows, indoor sporting events, conventions and other events. The Rochester Raiders indoor football team played there in 2010. Roc City Roller Derby has played there since 2009.

On May 10, 1977, the blues rock band Foghat recorded their double platinum selling album Foghat Live at this arena. 

The arena's trademark was the experimental green textile and rubber basketball court, which at the time was billed as the "future of basketball courts", (the "AstroTurf of basketball").  Although it was growing in popularity in Europe, the carpeted playing court never took off as a viable surface in the US, and a generation later "The Rug" remains an icon in the memories of those who recall the Dome Arena's short history as a professional sports venue.

The Dome Arena was the host to one of the most unusual games in basketball history.  In January 1979, the Rochester Zeniths were hosting the CBA All-Stars in the league's annual All-Star game.  At halftime, a major blizzard knocked out power in western New York, postponing completion of the game until the following evening.  Instead of merely completing the game by playing two more quarters, CBA Commissioner Jim Drucker decided that they would continue the game from the point of the blackout, but play an additional four quarters for the new fans in attendance the second night.  Thus, that game would be the only game in professional basketball history to feature six complete 12-minute "quarters".  The hometown Zeniths won the game, 182–168.

The Zeniths won CBA Championships in 1978–79 and 1980–81 while based out of the Dome Arena.

Minett Hall
It is also used for banquets, trade shows, conventions and other events.

Monroe County Fairgrounds
The Monroe County Fair Society organized its first fair in 1823, but it wasn’t until 1947 that it was moved to this more permanent location.  The arena and grounds were operated by the Monroe County Fair and Recreation Association until 2015, when the land was sold to an area developer.   The Fair was relocated to Monroe County’s Northampton Park in 2013, and again four years later when fair officials signed a 10 year lease with the Town of Rush.
 
Between 1950 and 1958, a one half mile clay oval on the premises annually hosted Grand National Series (now NASCAR Cup) events, which were won by notable racing pioneers including series champions Tim Flock, Lee Petty, and Herb Thomas.

References

External links

Buildings and structures in Monroe County, New York
Convention centers in New York (state)
Dome Centre
Indoor arenas in New York (state)
Sports venues in Monroe County, New York
Tourist attractions in Monroe County, New York
Sports in Rochester, New York
Continental Basketball Association venues
1972 establishments in New York (state)
Sports venues completed in 1972
Basketball venues in New York (state)
Indoor soccer venues in New York (state)
NASCAR tracks
Defunct motorsport venues in the United States